"Mad Over You" is a song by Nigerian singer Runtown, released on November 4, 2016. It was primarily produced by Del B, along with production assistance from Runtown and T-Spize. Described as a love-themed ballad, "Mad Over You" is a blend of Ghanaian highlife and R&B. It debuted at number 38 on the Billboard Twitter Top Tracks chart, marking the singer's first appearance on the chart. As of March 2017, "Mad Over You" garnered over 2 million streams on the streaming media service Spotify.

Background and music video
In March 2017, Runtown told Pulse Nigeria's Joey Akan he recorded "Mad Over You" while embroiled in a contractual dispute with Eric Many Entertainment. Two weeks prior to his U.S tour in mid-2016, he worked with Del B on musical ideas for the song. Del B told Akan "Mad Over You" was the last of two songs recorded during his session with Runtown. Vanessa Mdee was present in the studio when Del B and Runtown worked on the song's instrumental and flute, respectively. Runtown later contacted TSpize to provide guitar work. Lyrically, the song is about a special Ghanaian girl Runtown admires. Musically, it has a bouncy rhythm, infused with percussion, guitar and a flute. In an email exchange with The Fader magazine, Runtown said the song is inspired by African beauty.

The accompanying music video for "Mad Over You" was directed by Clarence Peters and was uploaded to YouTube on December 7, 2016. It features a small group of women, who displayed several different fashion pieces and body art. A writer for Joss magazine criticized the music video for not complementing the song's lyrics, saying the "choice for location in itself is an epic failure."

Critical reception
Gabriel Myers Hansen, whose review was posted on the E News Ghana website, described the song as a tribute to Ghana and said it "makes it into favorable places in history because of the sheer majesty of its swing–more so in the heart of  the young Ghanaian woman, who can recite word for word, even without having actively committed Runtown’s song to memory." Joey Akan of Pulse Nigeria called it a "mid-tempo song which can coast through you initially, but eventually grows and envelopes you with its synths, mellow drum patterns and more." TooXclusive's Jim Donnett praised Runtown for adapting the Ghanaian Alkayida sound to deliver a hit.

Covers and live performances
In December 2016, Nigerian musician Mr Eazi released a cover of the song. In January 2017, Ghanaian singer NanaYaa released her rendition of the song. In December 2016, Runtown performed the song at Citi FM’s Decemba 2 Remember concert. Moreover, he performed the song at Sarkodie's annual Rapperholic concert. In April 2017, Runtown performed the song at the season finale of Big Brother Naija. Jamaican dancehall artist Ding Dong covered the song in October 2017, pairing his version with a dance move he created called Lebeh Lebeh.

Accolades
"Mad Over You" was nominated for Best Single at the 2017 Nigeria Entertainment Awards. It was also nominated for Best Pop Single and Song of the Year at The Headies 2018. Moreover, the song earned Runtown a nomination in the Viewer's Choice category at the aforementioned awards show.

References

External links

2016 songs
2016 singles
Runtown songs
Song recordings produced by TSpize
Nigerian afropop songs